Križmani (in older sources also Križmane) is a small settlement in the hills above the left bank of the Kolpa River in the Municipality of Osilnica in southern Slovenia. The area is part of the traditional region of Lower Carniola and is now included in the Southeast Slovenia Statistical Region.

References

External links
Križmani on Geopedia

Populated places in the Municipality of Osilnica